"Secret Separation" is a song by British new wave rock group the Fixx, from their fourth studio album Walkabout. The single peaked at #19 on the US Billboard Hot 100 chart in July 1986 and peaked at No. 1 on the US Album Rock Tracks chart. The single also peaked at #39 in Canada and #83 in the United Kingdom.

Music video
The music video features an actor sitting at a control panel observing the band playing in an abandoned building filled with random items.

Track listing
7" vinyl
"Secret Separation" — 3:51
"Sense the Adventure" — 3:42

12" vinyl
"Secret Separation" — 7:00
"Sense the Adventure" — 3:42
"Rediscover" - 4:03

Chart performance

References 

1986 singles
The Fixx songs
1986 songs
Song recordings produced by Rupert Hine
MCA Records singles
Songs written by Jeannette Obstoj